The Kurd Laßwitz Award is a science fiction award from Germany. The award is named after the science fiction author Kurd Laßwitz. Eligible for nomination in all categories except for the Foreign Work category are only works published in German originally.

Wolfgang Jeschke has won the award 19 times in four different categories, while Andreas Eschbach has won the prize 11 times in two different categories. The foreign-language category includes novels, stories, collections and non-fiction. Iain Banks and China Miéville won the foreign-language prize four times. Other authors to win multiple times are Hans Joachim Alpers, Carl Amery, Herbert W. Franke, Ian McDonald, Michael Marrak, and Connie Willis.

Award winners

German-language Novel 

This category includes German-language works with a length of at least 100 pages by German-language authors which were published in German on a German-language market professionally for the first time in the award year.

1981: Georg Zauner, Die Enkel der Raketenbauer 
1982: Wolfgang Jeschke, The Last Day of Creation
1983: Richard Hey, Im Jahr 95 nach Hiroshima
1984: Thomas R. P. Mielke, Das Sakriversum
1985: Herbert W. Franke, Die Kälte des Weltraums
1986: Herbert W. Franke, Endzeit
1987: Carl Amery, Die Wallfahrer
1988: Gudrun Pausewang, Die Wolke
1989: Norbert Stöbe, New York ist himmlisch 
1990: Wolfgang Jeschke, Midas 
1991: Carl Amery, Das Geheimnis der Krypta 
1992: Christian Mähr, Fatous Staub 
1993: Herbert Rosendorfer, Die goldenen Heiligen oder Columbus entdeckt Europa 
1994: Thomas Ziegler, Die Stimmen der Nacht 
1995: Hans Joachim Alpers, Das zerrissene Land 
1996: Hans Joachim Alpers, Die graue Eminenz 
1997: Andreas Eschbach, Solarstation 
1998: No Award
1999: Andreas Eschbach, Jesus Video 
2000: Andreas Eschbach, Kelwitts Stern
2001: Michael Marrak, Lord Gamma 
2002: Andreas Eschbach, Quest 
2003: Michael Marrak, Imagon 
2004: Andreas Eschbach, Der Letzte seiner Art 
2005: Frank Schätzing, The Swarm
2006: Wolfgang Jeschke, Das Cusanus-Spiel 
2007: Herbert W. Franke, Auf der Spur des Engels 
2008: Andreas Eschbach, Ausgebrannt 
2009: Dietmar Dath, Die Abschaffung der Arten
2010: Andreas Eschbach, Ein König für Deutschland
2011: , Walpar Tonnraffir und der Zeigefinger Gottes
2012: Andreas Eschbach, Herr aller Dinge
2013: Dietmar Dath, Pulsarnacht
2014: Wolfgang Jeschke, Dschiheads
2015: , Drohnenland
2016: Andreas Brandhorst, Das Schiff
2017: Andreas Brandhorst, Omni
2018: Michael Marrak, Der Kanon mechanischer Seelen
2019: Andreas Eschbach, NSA – Nationales Sicherheits-Amt
2020: Andreas Eschbach, Das größte Abenteuer
2021: Andreas Eschbach, Eines Menschen Flügel
2022: , Nanopark

Foreign Work 

This category includes foreign-language fiction and non-fiction which was published as a German translation for the first time in the award year. Until 1997, it was called Foreign Novel.

 1984: Brian Aldiss, Helliconia Spring
 1985: Philip K. Dick, VALIS
 1986: Daniel Keyes, The Minds of Billy Milligan
 1987: Jerry Yulsman, Elleander Morning
 1988: Christopher Priest, The Glamour
 1989: Orson Scott Card, Speaker for the Dead
 1990: Lucius Shepard, Life During Wartime
 1991: Iain M. Banks, The Bridge
 1992: Iain M. Banks, The Wasp Factory
 1993: Iain M. Banks, Use of Weapons
 1994: Connie Willis, Doomsday Book
 1995: Ian McDonald, Scissors Cut Paper Wrap Stone
 1996: Stephen Baxter, The Time Ships
 1997: Kate Wilhelm, Death Qualified: A Mystery of Chaos
 1998: Iain M. Banks, Excession
 1999: Ian McDonald, Sacrifice of Fools
 2000: Greg Egan, Distress
 2001: Mary Doria Russell, The Sparrow
 2002: Connie Willis, To Say Nothing of the Dog
 2003: China Miéville, Perdido Street Station
 2004: Vernor Vinge, A Deepness in the Sky
 2005: China Miéville, The Scar
 2006: China Miéville, Iron Council
 2007: Robert Charles Wilson, Spin
 2008: Sergey Lukyanenko, Spectrum
 2009: Charles Stross, Glasshouse
 2010: John Scalzi, The Android's Dream
 2011: China Miéville, The City & the City
 2012: Paolo Bacigalupi, The Windup Girl
 2013: Ted Chiang, Hell Is the Absence of God
 2014: Jo Walton, Among Others
 2015: Ursula K. Le Guin, Paradises Lost
 2016: Neal Stephenson, Seveneves
 2017: Cixin Liu, The Three Body Problem
 2018: Nnedi Okorafor, The Book of Phoenix
 2019: Jasper Fforde, Early Riser
 2020: Margaret Atwood, The Testaments
 2021: Simon Stålenhag, Tales from the Loop
 2022: Kim Stanley Robinson, The Ministry for the Future

German-language Short Fiction (since 1997) 

This category includes German-language works with a length of less than 100 pages by German-language authors which were published in German on a German-language market professionally for the first time in the award year, i.e. it includes short stories and novelettes/novellas combined in one award category. From 1997–2007 it was called German-language Short Story (though it also included novelettes/novellas already). From 1981–1996 this category was split into two separate award categories for Novellette/Novella and Short Story.

 1997: Wolfgang Jeschke, Partner fürs Leben
 1998: Malte S. Sembten, Blind Date
 1999: Marcus Hammerschmitt, Wüstenlack
 2000: Wolfgang Jeschke, Die Cusanische Acceleratio
 2001: Marcus Hammerschmitt, Troubadoure
 2002: Wolfgang Jeschke, Allah akbar And So Smart Our NLWs
 2003: Erik Simon, Spiel beendet, sagte der Sumpf 
 2004: Angela Steinmüller and Karlheinz Steinmüller, Vor der Zeitreise
 2005: Wolfgang Jeschke, Das Geschmeide
 2006: , An e-Star is born
 2007: Marcus Hammerschmitt, Canea Null
 2008: Michael K. Iwoleit, Der Moloch
 2009: Andreas Eschbach, Survival-Training and Heidrun Jänchen, Ein Geschäft wie jedes andere
 2010: Ernst-Eberhard Manski, Das Klassentreffen der Weserwinzer
 2011: Michael K. Iwoleit, Die Schwelle
 2012: Frank W. Haubold, Am Ende der Reise
 2013: Klaus N. Frick, Im Käfig
 2014: Michael Marrak, Coen Sloterdykes diametral levitierendes Chronoversum
 2015: Fabian Tomaschek, Boatpeople
 2016: Karsten Kruschel, Was geschieht dem Licht am Ende des Tunnels?
 2017: Gabriele Behrend, Suicide Rooms
 2018: Uwe Hermann, Das Internet der Dinge
 2019: Thorsten Küper, Confinement
 2020: Jacqueline Montemurri, Koloss aus dem Orbit
 2021: Angela Steinmüller and Karlheinz Steinmüller, Marslandschaften
 2022: Aiki Mira, Utopie-27

Radio drama 

Although a prize has been awarded for a best work of radio drama since 1987, it is only since 1993 that a winner has been selected by a jury

 1993: Eva Maria Mudrich, Sommernachtstraum
 1994: not awarded
 1995: not awarded
 1996: Wolfgang Rindfleisch, Uhrwerk Orange (derivative of Anthony Burgess, 'A Clockwork Orange'). Director: Wolfgang Rindfleisch. Music: Trötsch
 1997: Friedrich Bestenreiner, 'Paradise Hospital Inc.'. Director: Thomas Werner
 1998: Karlheinz Knuth, Die Tage nebenan – or: Da, wo Cäsar nicht ermordet wurde. Director: Thomas Werner
 1999: Heiko Michael Hartmann, MOI. Director: Oliver Sturm
 2000: Marina Dietz, Träumen Androiden (derivative of Philip K. Dick, 'Do Androids Dream of Electric Sheep'). Regie: Marina Dietz
 2001: not awarded
 2002: Walter Adler, Tokio liebt uns nicht mehr (derivative of Ray Loriga). Director: Walter Adler
 2003: not awarded
 2004: not awarded
 2005: Norbert Schaeffer, Das letzte Geheimnis (derivative of Bernard Werber). Director: Norbert Schaeffer
 2006: Matthias Wittekindt, Das Lewskow-Manuscript. Director: Alexander Schuhmacher. Music: Tim Frühwirth, Lömsch Le Mans, Frank Wingold
 2007: Matthias Scheliga, Amnesia. Regie: Jürgen Dluzniewski
 2008: nicht vergeben
 2009: Bodo Traber & Tilman Zens, Die Flüsterer, Director: Petra Feldhoff
 2010: not awarded
 2011: not awarded
 2012: Till Müller-Klug, Sprachlabor Babylon, Director: Thomas Wolfertz, Musik: Ekkehard Ehlers
 2013: Heinz von Cramer, Unerwartete Ereignisse, Director: Burkhard Schmid
 2014: not awarded
 2015: Walter Adler, Foxfinder, Director: Walter Adler
 2016: Georg Heinzen, Sale, Director: Martin Zylka
 2017: not awarded
 2018: Bodo Traber, Paradise Revisited, Director: Bodo Traber
 2019: Anne Krüger, Supermarkt, Director: Andrea Getto
 2020: Gerrit Booms, Unser Leben in den Wäldern (derivative of Marie Darrieussecq)
 2021: Heinz Sommer, Der zweite Schlaf
 2022: Christian Wittmann and Georg Zeitblom, r_crusoe™

Other categories 
 Graphic Artist (1981–1992)
 Graphic Artwork (since 1993)
 Translator (1981–1992)
 Translation (since 1993)
 Movie (1987–1996)
 Special Award for Extraordinary Accomplishments
 2004: Franz Rottensteiner, on the occasion of the hundredth number of the Quarber Merkur magazine he edited

See also
 Deutscher Science Fiction Preis

References

External links

 
 Kurd Laßwitz Award at the Internet Speculative Fiction Database

German science fiction awards
German literary awards
Awards established in 1981